Gillette v. United States, 401 U.S. 437 (1971), is a decision from the Supreme Court of the United States, adding constraints on the terms of conscientious objection resulting from draftees in the Selective Service.

Background and Consolidation 
Gillette v. United States was argued under the consolidation of Gillette v. United States and Negre v. Larsen. Guy Gillette was convicted for failing to report for induction to service in Vietnam after his requests for conscientious objection were rejected. Gillette's reasons for objection were based on the grounds of a moral disposition towards fighting in the Vietnam War specifically, not that of all wars, to which the draft board denied. Louis Negre sought objection to Vietnam on the grounds of religious objection to what he as a Catholic referred to as "unjust killings."  Inevitably, Negre was deployed against his will to Vietnam after “the Army 'assigned four enlisted personnel to seize his arms and legs and carry him on board the aircraft which carried him to Vietnam.'”  In a post-decision interview Negre clarifies the incorrect Court description of his pacifism by claiming "I want to say that I am not a pacifist, but I did not oppose other wars at the time because I was not being asked to fight in other wars at the time;"  which further draws the line between Catholic objectors and members of Quaker or Mennonite faiths which have pacifist trends rooted in their origins. In its core the case of Gillette v. United States, as explained by Justice Marshall, is "maintaining a fair system" for determining "who serves when not all serve."

Humanism and objection 

Gillette, in his petition, states his objections to combat in Vietnam as the following: "I object to any assignment in the United States Armed Forces while this unnecessary and unjust war is being waged, on the grounds of religious belief specifically 'Humanism'. This essentially means respect and love for man, faith in his inherent goodness and perfectability, and confidence in his capability to improve some of the pains of the human condition."  Gillette argues that the section of the Selective Service Act discriminates against his Humanist view which may be seen as not being a "well-recognized religious sect or organization" which received protection from serving in wars in the Draft Act of 1917. . Since the adaptation of the conscientious objection clause it has been repeatedly supported that only religious factions, such as the Quakers and Mennonites, that advocate pacifism in all respects can be subject to conscientious objection.

Decision of the Court 
Justice Thurgood Marshall wrote the opinion of court, in an 8-1 vote, decided March 8, 1971. In the opinion, Marshall observes that "the section [§ 6(j) of the [ Selective Service Act of 1967 ] says that anyone who is conscientiously opposed to all war shall be relieved of military service" covers all religious objection to all wars with "no particular sectarian affiliation or theological position required." [6]
Douglas in his dissent juxtaposes the position of Gillette, and his belief in "humanism," to that of John Sisson in Sisson v. United States. Douglas goes on further to claim "There is no doubt that the views of Gillette are sincere, genuine, and profound. The District Court in the present case faced squarely the issue presented in Sisson, and, being unable to distinguish the case on the facts, refused to follow Sisson." Douglas continues on to extend the right to judge a war as just, or unjust, to each individual "who must make on the basis of his own conscience after studying the facts." Citing both the Fifth Commandment and the Pastoral Constitution as reasons for members of the Catholic Church such as Negre to object to each war they would otherwise be forced to partake in which they may judge combat as the killing of "innocent people."

References

External links
 

United States Supreme Court cases
United States Supreme Court cases of the Burger Court
1971 in United States case law